Calm Animals is the fifth studio album by British new wave band the Fixx, released on February 7, 1989. The single "Driven Out" gave them a #1 song on the Mainstream Rock Tracks chart in early 1989, and reached #55 on the Billboard Hot 100.   Additionally, the single "Precious Stone" reached the top 25 on the Mainstream Rock Tracks chart later that year. Calm Animals was also the Fixx's only album to be released on RCA Records.

Track listing
All songs are written by Cy Curnin, Adam Woods, Jamie West-Oram, Rupert Greenall, and Dan K. Brown, except where noted.

"I'm Life" – 3:19
"Driven Out" – 3:59
"Subterranean" – 3:43
"Precious Stone" (The Fixx, Woods) – 3:08
"Gypsy Feet" (Curnin, The Fixx) – 4:03
"Calm Animals" – 4:12
"Shred of Evidence" – 3:41
"The Flow" (Curnin, The Fixx) – 2:59
"World Weary" (Curnin, The Fixx) – 4:38
"Cause to Be Alarmed" (Curnin, The Fixx) – 3:46
"Never Mind What You Leave Behind" [*] (Curnin, The Fixx) – 3:17

* bonus track on 2001 CD re-issue

Personnel
Cy Curnin – guitar, lead vocals
Adam Woods – drums, percussion, backing vocals
Rupert Greenall – keyboards, backing vocals
Jamie West-Oram – guitar, backing vocals
Dan K. Brown – bass guitar, backing vocals, fretless bass

Production
Producer: William Wittman
Engineers: John Agnello, Richard Moakes, David Thoener
Assistant engineer: Ted Trewhella
Mixing: David Thoener
Art direction: Ed Spyra
Photography: Chris Parker 	
Paintings: George Underwood

Charts
Album - Billboard (United States)

Singles - Billboard (United States)

References

The Fixx albums
1989 albums
RCA Records albums
Albums recorded at AIR Studios